Amblyjoppa fuscipennis is a species of the parasitic wasp in the family Ichneumonidae. It was first described by Constantin Wesmael in 1844.

Subspecies
 Amblyjoppa fuscipennis nigriventris (Habermehl 1917)

Description
It is a large black wasp with white spots between the eyes, a reddish abdomen, darkened wings and orange legs. The antennae of the males are completely black, while the females show a white band in the middle. These wasps can mainly be found in August.

This species looks very similar to Protichneumon pisorius, but in the genus Amblyjoppa there is a longitudinal fold only on the second abdominal sternite, while in the genus Protichneumon these abdominal sternites are often present in the second to fourth tergites.

Distribution
This species is present in most of Europe (Austria; Belgium; Bulgaria; Czechoslovakia; Finland; France; Germany; Hungary; Ireland; Italy; Lithuania; Luxembourg; Netherlands; Norway; Poland; Romania; Russia; Spain; Sweden; Switzerland; United Kingdom; former Yugoslavia), in the Near East, in North Africa, and in the Oriental realm.

References

Ichneumonidae
Insects described in 1844